All Pro Wrestling is an American professional wrestling promotion and training school, based in Hayward, California. The company was founded by Roland Alexander and managed by him until his death on November 5, 2013. It is located 45 miles southeast of San Francisco, 15 miles south of Oakland, and 35 miles north of San Jose.

History
All Pro Wrestling opened in 1991 under the name, "Pacific Coast Sports". The school and its "Gym Wars" events maintained a strong local following throughout the 1990s, but it wasn't until professional wrestling's Attitude Era that APW gained national notoriety.

In 1999, All Pro Wrestling (APW) was featured as part of the documentary film, Beyond the Mat. Roland Alexander, along with wrestlers Tony Jones and Michael Modest appeared, as they were having a tryout match with the World Wrestling Federation. The spot in the film was said to have tremendously boosted the school's "Boot Camp" sign ups.

APW suffered a wrongful death lawsuit to the family of APW Boot Camp trainee, Brian Ong. On May 28, 2001, Ong was training with fellow trainee Dalip Singh, despite suffering from an earlier concussion. Singh delivered a flapjack to Ong twice, with his head striking the mat and worsening his concussion. He was pronounced dead on arrival to a local hospital. Ong's family sued APW for reckless behavior. The case was filed in September 2002, and the trial was underway on June 10, 2005. After a three-week trial, on July 12, the jury voted unanimously in favor of the Ong family. APW was forced to pay $1.3 million to the Ong family.

After a dispute with Roland Alexander in 2002, most of the APW roster, including trainers Michael Modest, Donovan Morgan, and Frank Murdoch left the company to start a training facility known as the Pro Wrestling IRON Tetsu Academy (now defunct). In April 2008, booker and promoter Gabriel Ramirez left the company to start his own promotion, Pro Wrestling Revolution. Former wrestling manager John LaRocca took over as head booker for the company.

In October 2005, future WWE champion Becky Lynch (using the ring name Rebecca Knox) appeared at the APW affiliated promotion ChickFight III.

In December 2009, APW began televising taped shows All Pro Wrestling Gym Wars on Saturday mornings on Channel 50 / Cable 199 in the San Francisco Bay Area.

On December 14, 2011, All Pro Wrestling and Vendetta Pro Wrestling announced the Vendetta Pro Tag Team Titles will now be booked in All Pro Wrestling as well. The title was renamed the APW-Vendetta Pro "Unified" Tag Team Championship and be defended on Vendetta Pro and APW events. At that time "Dos Perfectos" (Greg Hernandez and Jesse Jimenez) were the Vendetta Pro Tag Team Champions and were crowned the first APW/Vendetta Pro Unified Tag Team Champions.

Alexander died on November 5, 2013, following heart and diabetes issues, aged 59.

The company is now run by head booker Markus Mac and is currently holding events at the Bayshore Community Center in Daly City, CA. After the closing of the APW Garage head trainer Jeckles opened his own school, the Puppet Masters Dojo, in Hayward, CA.

Roster

Wrestlers

Managers and valets
 Markus Mac 
 Caesar Black 
 Brian Zane 
 Lucian D. Light 
 Buddy Sotello(Master of the contract & leader of the Sotello Syndicate. Claimed that he was the attorney to George Steinbrenner, Woody Allen, Leona Helmsley and Donald Trump and that his suspenders were a personal gift from Larry King) managed Vinnie Massaro, Bison Smith(as Super Destroyer 2000), Sheik Boom Boom Comini, Sean Patrick O Doul & Dalip Singh (The Great Khali).

Staff
 Markus Mac 

 Sparkey Ballard 
 Shane Mai

APW Championships/Accomplishments

Current championships

APW Junior Heavyweight Championship

Reigns

Defunct Championships

Tournaments/Special events
List of All Pro Wrestling tournaments

See also
List of independent wrestling promotions in the United States

References

External links
 All Pro Wrestling official website
 All Pro Wrestling Youtube Channel
 All Pro Wrestling's Top Graduates

Independent professional wrestling promotions based in California
Professional wrestling schools
Companies based in Hayward, California
Tourist attractions in Alameda County, California
Sports in Hayward, California
Education in Hayward, California